Jaume Delgado Catevilla (born 13 May 1983), known simply as Jaume, is a Spanish retired footballer who played as a midfielder.

Football career
Born in Barcelona, Catalonia, Jaume made his senior debut with local RCD Espanyol B. He spent the vast majority of his career with clubs from his native region, only leaving in the summer of 2006 when he signed with CD Logroñés and in the 2012 off-season when he joined Deportivo Alavés.

In the 2012–13 campaign, Jaume was an ever-present figure for Alavés, appearing in 45 matches all competitions comprised (40 in the league including the playoffs) as his team achieved promotion to Segunda División. He made his professional debut on 16 August 2013 at the age of 30, in a 0–1 away defeat against Girona FC.

References

External links

1983 births
Living people
Footballers from Barcelona
Spanish footballers
Association football midfielders
Segunda División players
Segunda División B players
RCD Espanyol B footballers
UE Figueres footballers
Terrassa FC footballers
CD Logroñés footballers
UE Lleida players
Lleida Esportiu footballers
Deportivo Alavés players
CF Reus Deportiu players